The Georgian ambassador in Beijing is the official representative of the Government in Tbilisi to the Government of the People's Republic of China.

History 
On 9 June 1992 Georgia and People's Republic of China signed the Protocol on the establishment of diplomatic relations

List of representatives

References 

Ambassadors of Georgia (country) to China
China
Georgia

ka:საქართველოს საელჩო ჩინეთში